Delos or Delos Mountain was the ancient name of a mountain located in Boeotia, Greece, above the city of Tegyra.  The mountain was sacred to Apollo, to whom temples on its slopes were dedicated.

References
Hazlitt, Classical Gazetteer, "Delos"
Richard Talbert, Barrington Atlas of the Greek and Roman World,, p. 55

Geography of ancient Boeotia
Mountains of Greece
Sacred mountains
Apollo
Mountains of Central Greece
Landforms of Boeotia